Xiaowangmiao Subdistrict is a subdistrict in Fenghua District, Ningbo, Zhejiang province China. It lies on the south bank of the Shan River, and takes its name from the Temple of King Xiao. The subdistrict includes the village of Yuanjia'ao.

Administrative divisions 
Xiaowangmiao Subdistrict is divided into 1 residential community and 21 administrative villages.

 Xiaowangmiao Community
 Yuanjia'ao Village
 Cilin Village
 Linjia Village
 Qiange Village
 Qingyun Village
 Chenjia'ao Village
 Fujia'ao Village
 Tengtou Village
 Xiaoqiaotou Village
 Tangwan Village
 Chenlangdai Village
 Dabu Village
 Tang'ao Village
 Yunxi Village
 Heying Village
 Yunji Village
 Paiting Village
 Lingfeng Village
 Wuxing Village
 Panqian Village
 Houzhu Village

References 

Township-level divisions of Zhejiang
Geography of Ningbo
Subdistricts of the People's Republic of China